Structural film was an avant-garde experimental film movement prominent in the United States in the 1960s and which developed into the Structural/materialist films in the United Kingdom in the 1970s.

Overview
The term was coined by P. Adams Sitney who noted that film artists had moved away from the complex and condensed forms of cinema practiced by such artists as Sidney Peterson and Stan Brakhage. "Structural film" artists pursued instead a more simplified, sometimes even predetermined art. The shape of the film was crucial, the content peripheral. This term should not be confused with the literary and philosophical term structuralism.

Characteristics

Sitney identified four formal characteristics common in Structural films, but all four characteristics are not usually present in any single film:
 fixed camera position (an apparently fixed framing)
 flicker effect (strobing due to the intermittent nature of film)
 loop printing
 rephotography (off the screen)

It has been noted by George Maciunas that these characteristics are also present in Fluxus films.

Key films 
The Flicker (Tony Conrad, 1965)
Wavelength (Michael Snow, 1966–67)
T,O,U,C,H,I,N,G (Paul Sharits, 1968)
One Second in Montreal (Michael Snow, 1969)
Zorns Lemma (Hollis Frampton, 1970)
Serene Velocity (Ernie Gehr, 1970)
Remedial Reading Comprehension (George Landow, 1971)
The United States of America (James Benning and Bette Gordon, 1975)

Key filmmakers
Bette Gordon 
James Benning
Tony Conrad
Hollis Frampton
Ernie Gehr
Birgit and Wilhelm Hein 
Kurt Kren
George Landow (a.k.a. Owen Land)
Paul Sharits
Michael Snow
Joyce Wieland
Sharon Lockhart

See also
Non-narrative film
Still image film
Collage film
Minimalist film

References

Bibliography
Gidal, Peter. Materialist Film Routledge; First Edition, Second Impression edition (Mar. 1989).
de Lauretis, Teresa and Stephen Heath (eds). The Cinematic Apparatus. Macmillan, 1980.
Heath, Stephen. Questions of Cinema.  Bloomington: Indiana UP, 1981.
Maciunas, George. "Some Comments on Structural Film by P. Adams Sitney." Film Culture, No. 47, 1969.
O'Pray, Michael. The British Avant-Garde Film 1926 to 1995: An Anthology of Writings. Indiana University Press, 2003.
Sitney, P. Adams. Visionary Film: The American Avant-Garde 1943-1978. Second Edition, Oxford University Press 1979

Experimental film
Film and video terminology
1960s in film
1970s in film
Film styles